Nils Gustav Oskar Palm (21 January 1904 – 10 September 1957) is a Swedish former footballer who played as a midfielder. Palm made 20 Svenska Serien and Allsvenskan appearances for Djurgården and scored 7 goals.

References

1904 births
1957 deaths
Association football midfielders
Swedish footballers
Djurgårdens IF Fotboll players
AIK Fotboll players
Allsvenskan players
Svenska Serien players
Footballers from Stockholm